Jamiat Ulema-e-Hind is a council of Indian Sunni Muslim scholars. It was established in November 1919 by a group of scholars including Abdul Bari Firangi Mahali, Ahmad Saeed Dehlavi and Kifayatullah Dehlawi. The following is a list of people associated with it.

List of founders
 Abdul Bari Firangi Mahali, was a leader of Indian freedom struggle. He was among the students of Abd al-Hayy al-Lucknawi. 
 Abdul Haleem Gayawi
 Abul Muhasin Sajjad, was the founder of Muslim Independent Party. He also established the Imarat-e-Sharia in Bihar. 
 Ahmad Saeed Dehlavi
 Azad Subhani
 Bakhsh Amritsari
 Ibrahim Darbhangawi
 Kifayatullah Dehlawi
 Khuda Bakhsh Muzaffarpuri
 Khwaja Ghulam Nizamuddin
 Muhammad Ibrahim Mir Sialkoti
 Sanaullah Amritsari
 Mazharuddin
 Muhammad Abdullah
 Muhammad Akram Khan, was the founder and editor of The Azad. He also published newspapers such as Akhbār-e-Muḥammadi in Bangla and Akhbār-e-Zamāna in Urdu. 
 Muhammad Anees
 Muhammad Asadullah Sindhi
 Muhammad Imam Sindhi
 Muhammad Fakhir
 Muhammad Sadiq Karachivi, was a student of Mahmud Hasan Deobandi and Khalil Ahmad Saharanpuri. He established the Jamiat Ulama in Karachi as the then state-unit of Jamiat Ulama-e-Hind. 
 Muniruzzaman Khan, was a resident of Islamabad (Chittagong), and a staunch critic of the Pakistan movement. He died in Kolkata. 
 Qadeer Bakhsh 
 Sayyid Ismail
 Sayyid Kamaluddin
 Sayyid Muhammad Dawood
 Taj Muhammad

List of presidents

List of general secretaries

Jamiat Ulema-e-Hind (Arshad)

Presidents

General secretaries

Jamiat Ulema-e-Hind (Mahmood)

Presidents

General secretaries

Others
People who have been in the executive or working committee of the Jamiat Ulema-e-Hind, or have served other related positions, like, state-president for any Indian state.
 Abul Kalam Azad
 Ahmad Ali Lahori
 Anwar Shah Kashmiri
 Badruddin Ajmal
 Habib-ur-Rehman Ludhianvi
 Hakim Ajmal Khan
 Hasrat Mohani
 Matinul Haq Usama Qasmi
 Murtaza Hasan Chandpuri
 Rahmatullah Mir Qasmi
 Saifuddin Kitchlew
 Shabbir Ahmad Usmani
 Sulaiman Nadwi
 Zafar Ali Khan

References

Citations

Bibliography

 
 
 
 

Deobandi-related lists
Jamiat Ulama-e-Hind
Deobandis